Olappeeppi is a 2016 Indian Malayalam periodic family-drama film written and directed by Krish Kymal and produced by Sunil Ibrahim under the production house, Vibezon Movies. The film stars Biju Menon, Paris Laxmi, Reina Maria, and Sreejith Ravi. Olappeeppi was released on 30 September 2016, by Eros International.

Synopsis
The story is set in Kerala in the 1970s, in the backdrop of various socio-economic changes that prevailed in the state during the execution of the Land Reform Act in 1977. The story focuses on the turmoil created in an upper class feudal family due to the Land Reform Act.

Cast

 Punasseri Kanchana as Muthassi      
 Biju Menon         
 Paris Laxmi
 Reina Maria
 Sreejith Ravi
 Jebbar Chemad
 Kanchana
 Anjali Nair
 Master Dev

Soundtrack
Olappeeppi features one song, "Ela Pulayelo", composed by Anil Johnson and sung by Jayakrishnan R., Fathimathul Liyana, Chinmayi S. Nath, and Shreya S. Ajith. The 3 minute 15 seconds long song was released on 3 September 2016 by Eros Music.

Release
Olappeeppi, earlier scheduled to release on 23 September 2016, by Eros International, was rescheduled and released on 30 September 2016.

Awards
 Kerala State Film Award for Best Character Actress - Kanchana P. K.

References

2016 films
Films set in the 1970s
2010s Malayalam-language films